The 2020–21 season was the 117th season in the existence of Royal Antwerp F.C. and the club's fourth consecutive season in the top flight of Belgian football. In addition to the domestic league, Antwerp participated in this season's editions of the Belgian Cup, of which they were the reigning champions, the Belgian Super Cup and participated in the UEFA Europa League. The season covered the period from 1 July 2020 to 30 June 2021.

Players

First-team squad

Transfers

In

Out

Pre-season and friendlies

Competitions

Overview

Belgian First Division A

Regular season

Results summary

Results by round

Matches
The league fixtures were announced on 8 July 2020.

Play-Off I

Results summary

Results by round

Matches

Belgian Cup

UEFA Europa League

Group stage

The group stage draw was held on 2 October 2020.

Knockout phase

Round of 32
The draw for the round of 32 was held on 14 December 2020.

Statistics

Squad appearances and goals
Last updated on 23 May 2021.

|-
! colspan=12 style=background:#dcdcdc; text-align:center|Goalkeepers

|-
! colspan=12 style=background:#dcdcdc; text-align:center|Defenders

|-
! colspan=12 style=background:#dcdcdc; text-align:center|Midfielders

|-
! colspan=12 style=background:#dcdcdc; text-align:center|Forwards

|-
! colspan=12 style=background:#dcdcdc; text-align:center|Players who have made an appearance this season but have left the club

|}

Goalscorers

References

External links

Royal Antwerp F.C. seasons
Antwerp
Antwerp